Demon (Ainu: カムイヌプリ, Kamui-nupuri; , Kamui-dake) is a stratovolcano located at the northern end of Iturup Island, Kuril Islands, Russia.

The Ilya Muromets Waterfall, one of the highest in Russia, falls abruptly from the eastern slope of the volcano into the Pacific Ocean.

In popular culture
The Demon Volcano undergoes a VEI 7 eruption in Kirov series novel 9 Days Falling.

See also
List of volcanoes in Russia

References 
 

Iturup
Volcanoes of the Kuril Islands
Mountains of the Kuril Islands
Stratovolcanoes of Russia
Holocene stratovolcanoes
Holocene Asia